Shahrinav (Tajik: Шаҳринав) is a village and jamoat in Tajikistan. It is located in Shahrinav District, one of the Districts of Republican Subordination. It is the seat of the Shahrinav District. The jamoat has a total population of 11,123 (2015).

References

Populated places in Districts of Republican Subordination
Jamoats of Tajikistan